Crickhowell Market Hall, formerly Crickhowell Town Hall, is a municipal building in the High Street, Crickhowell, Powys, Wales. The structure, which accommodates market stalls on the ground floor and a café on the first floor, is a Grade II* listed building.

History 
The first municipal building in the town was a market hall in the centre of the High Street which was completed in the 17th century. After the original building became dilapidated, it was demolished and later replaced by a memorial fountain dedicated to a local medical doctor, Henry John Lucas of Aberystwyth. In the early 1830s, the lord of the manor, Henry Somerset, 6th Duke of Beaufort, whose seat was at Raglan Castle, decided to commission a new building; the site he selected was on the west side of the High Street, a short distance to the west of the site of the original building. The new building was designed in the Renaissance style by Thomas Henry Wyatt, who was a nephew of the duke's agent, built in ashlar stone and was completed in 1834.

The design involved a symmetrical main frontage with three bays facing onto the High Street. On the ground floor, there was a tetrastyle portico created by pairs of Doric order columns in antis. On the first floor, the central bay, which was slightly recessed, was fenestrated by a sash window with an architrave and a bracketed cornice, surmounted by a carving of the Beaufort coat of arms and a modillioned cornice. The outer bays were fenestrated by sash windows in the same style, surmounted by entablatures and modillioned cornices, and flanked by rubble masonry quoins. Internally, the principal rooms were the market hall on the ground floor and a courtroom on the first floor.

After the area became a rural district in 1894, the new rural district council used the building, by then referred to as the town hall, as its meeting place. The courtroom on the first floor also continued to be used for magistrates court hearings as well as for child welfare surgeries. It continued in these roles for much of the 20th century but ceased to be the local civic meeting place when the enlarged Brecknock Borough Council was formed in 1974. A new projecting clock was installed on the front of the building to celebrate the Golden Jubilee of Elizabeth II in 2002. The courtroom on the first floor was adapted for retail use and operated as the Cheese Press Café until it closed in 2006.

In 2007, Powys County Council offered a 99-year leasehold interest in the building to a newly-formed charity, the Market Hall Trust, at a subsidised rent. The building was subsequently refurbished by the charity and the room on the first floor re-opened as the Courtroom Café in 2008.

See also
 Grade II* listed buildings in Powys

References 

Grade II* listed buildings in Powys
Government buildings completed in 1834
City and town halls in Wales
Crickhowell